Viernes de Fútbol (Spanish for Soccer Friday) is the Friday night broadcast of Major League Soccer produced by Univision Deportes for broadcast by UniMás and the Univision Deportes Network. Started in 2015, it is the first and (as of 2016) only exclusive broadcast of any major professional sports league in the United States and Canada on a Spanish language television network. English language commentary is available using the second audio program and on Twitter.

Personalities

See also
 MLS Soccer Sunday

References

External links
 MLS page on Univision Deportes

Major League Soccer on television
2015 American television series debuts
UniMás original programming